Tetragonia fruticosa, or kinkelbossie, is an endemic Southern African coastal perennial shrub or scrambler, well-suited to dune sand stabilisation and often browsed by livestock and game. It is found from sea-level to about 1100 metres.

The fruits are unusual for Aizoaceae being four-winged, single-seeded and indehiscent. The wings are green and succulent at first, drying and becoming papery and brown, aiding in dispersal of the seed by wind. The flowers are a rich source of pollen and nectar for honeybees.

References

fruticosa
Plants described in 1753
Taxa named by Carl Linnaeus